Sol Kyung-gu (born May 14, 1967) is a South Korean actor. Sol studied Theater and Film at Hanyang University. Upon his graduation in 1994, he appeared in numerous theatrical productions, such as the hit Korean adaptation of the German rock musical Subway Line 1, and productions of Sam Shepard's True West and A. R. Gurney's Love Letters. He is best known for his roles in Public Enemy film series, Peppermint Candy, Oasis, Silmido, Hope and The Merciless.

Early Years
Sol was born in Seocheon, ChungcheongNam on May 1, 1968. He is the second son with one younger sister. He and his family moved to Dohwa-dong, Mapo-gu, Seoul when his father, who was a civil servant, transferred to the Mapo-gu Office.

Sol's parents wanted him to go to an engineering college, thus guaranteeing him a stable job. However, Sol entered the Department of Theater and Film of Hanyang University with the idea of becoming a film director.

Career

Early Career: 1993-1997 
Sol studied Theater and Film at Hanyang University (Class of '86). In May 1993, When Sol was in his 4th year of college, he directed play for the 1st Young Theatre Festival. At that time, Seol planned to enter The 3rd KBS Talent Recruitment, but he had no choice but to give up the recruitment due to his professor's request. Gradually, he naturally gave up his dream of becoming a film director, and debuted in 1993 with the play Simbasame as Sol joined Hanyang Theater Company, a theater company with alumni of the Department of Theater and Film at Hanyang University as majority of its members.

When Sol was in his 4th year of college, Sol received a full scholarship with straight A credits and went up to the department at once. Before graduating from Hanyang University, he received invitations from his advisor to study master at Hanyang University graduate school or Korea National University of Arts, but he refused. Sol continued his theatre activities in Hanyang Theater Company, however Sol didn’t want to be under the shadow of his school. After graduating, Sol left the company.

In May 1994, Sol asked a college senior who was the head of the planning department at the theater company . At  for a part time job. He met Kim Min-ki and was cast in hit Korean adaptation of the German rock musical Subway Line 1. Sol participated in this work from the premiere in 1994 to 1996, playing all but two of the 80 roles, accumulating various experiences and acting skills and earned big success. In addition, he has been active as a theater actor and musical actor in Daehakro, appearing in plays such as Korean productions of Sam Shepard's True West and musical .

Since 1988, Sol began taking taking on minor roles in television. In the play, he was a star-actor who played 14 roles, but in television dramas, he was just an aspiring actor. In the mid 1990s, Sol began taking on minor roles in feature films. In 1996, Sol made his screen debut in his first film A Petal, playing the role of Woo-ri, a college student who is chasing the whereabouts of the female lead girl (Lee Jung-hyun) at the recommendation of director Shim Kwang-jin, a college classmate who was taking directing lessons from director Jang Seon-woo.

1998-2002: Career Breakthrough 
In 1997, Sol met Cha Seung-jae, the CEO of Sidus FNH, the producer of the film Girls' Night Out, which released in 1998. Sol had minor role and his name was post in credit as a film actor. Sol played a cartoonist who spends a night with Yeon (Jin Hee-kyung), a hotel employee in the play, and his acting was short but impressive. He then signed management contracts with Sidus HQ and made his breakthrough, with major roles in Rainbow Trout, Phantom: The Submarine, and The Bird That Stops in the Air (1999).

In early 1999, Sol was selected for the lead role through an audition in director Lee Chang-dong's film Peppermint Candy. Initially, Sol failed at the first audition, but the director's wife, known as the playwright of the play Confession, saw him in the audition film she saw in the living room by chance, and recommended him, saying, "Here's Kim Young-ho" he is famous.

In addition, director Lee Chang-dong revealed the reason for casting Seol Kyung-gu as follows.Unlike other actors, I rather liked that he hesitated and said that he had no confidence. He looked weak in charisma with an ordinary mask, but his face was different every time I saw him, and that seemed to enable him to express various colors as well as good and evil, so he was cast.In film Peppermint Candy, Sol played Kim Yeong-ho, a suicidal man devastated by the two-decades of historical change his country undergoes. After shooting for six months from mid-May to the end of September, the film debuted on October 14 of that year as the opening film at the 4th Busan International Film Festival. The film was acclaimed and Sol received rave reviews. He swept 10 New Actor Awards and Best Actor Awards at the Korean Film Critics Association Award, Chunsa Film Awards, Blue Dragon Film Awards, Daejong Awards, and Baeksang Arts Awards.

Sol next appeared in a romantic comedy I Wish I Had a Wife with Jeon Do-yeon in 2001, played the role of Bong-su, an ordinary old bachelor bank clerk who yearns for romance. Then acted in a Japanese TV drama produced by NHK.

In 2002, Sol starred in three major films. As a violent and unscrupulous police detective in Public Enemy, he won Best Actor at the Grand Bell Awards and Blue Dragon Film Awards respectively. In August, he starred in Lee Chang-dong's acclaimed third film Oasis, which won the Silver Lion for Best Director at the Venice Film Festival. Sol's portrayal of mildly mentally disabled outcast with sociopathic inclinations won him Best Actor at the Chunsa Film Art Awards, Korean Association of Film Critics Awards, Korean Film Awards, Director's Cut Awards, and 29th Seattle International Film Festival. In November, he acted together with Cha Seung-won in a box office hit Jail Breakers by director Kim Sang-jin.

2003-2011: Success as a box-office actor 
In 2003, Sol starred in Silmido directed by Cinema Service founder Kang Woo-suk, which became the first Korean film in history to gross 10 million admissions. His next role was as the title character in Rikidōzan, about the legendary ethnic Korean pro wrestler who became a national hero in Japan in the 1950s. Sol gained 20 kilograms for the role and also delivered 95% of his lines in Japanese. Although his performance was acclaimed, the film vastly underperformed on its local release.

In 2005, Sol starred in the sequel Another Public Enemy, which ended up outgrossing the original. This was followed by a second sequel, Public Enemy Returns in 2008. His other films Haeundae (2009), The Tower (2012) and Cold Eyes (2013) have also been box office hits. For his performance in Haeundae, he won Grand Prize at the 2009 Korean Culture and Entertainment Awards, followed by Best Actor award at the 18th Chunsa Film Art Awards for his performance in 2010 film No Mercy.

In October 2005, Seol Kyung-gu played the role of the male protagonist Andy in A. R. Gurney's Love Letters by the theatre company Hanyang Repertory. It was directed Professor , his acting teacher. It was his comeback onstage for the first time in years since his latest the musical Subway Line 1.

2012-2015: Career resurgence 
Seol Kyung-gu returned to the movie after about a year and a half with the disaster movie Tower in December 2012. In 2013, Seol appeared in three movies Cold Eyes, The Spy: Undercover Operation, and Hope and mobilised a total of 1681 million viewers in 2013. He ranked 2nd after Song Kang-ho in the box office actor. In director Lee Jun-ik's family drama Hope, which is based on the child sexual assault case, also called the 'Cho Doo-soon case', Seol played the role of Dong-hoon, expressing the desperate need of a father to watch his daughter's pain and suffering, and resonating with the audience. He received favorable reviews for his excellent acting, and won the him Best Actor at the 50th Baeksang Arts Awards.

In a media interview, director Lee Jun-ik commented on Seol Kyung-gu as follows.He was a very respectable actor. Before filming, he came to the scene with a lot of emotion and only looked at the wall, but when the filming started, she poured out her emotions terribly. Because of Sol Kyung-gu, he was able to complete 'Wish'. he is a great learner.The following year, Sol starred in My Dictator, as an aspiring actor who is forced to impersonate North Korean leader. For his performance in My Dictator, he won Best Actor at the 35th Golden Cinematography Awards.

Sol began teaching acting in 2014, at his alma mater Hanyang University, as an adjunct professor in the College of Performing Arts.

In 2015, Sol starred in the war drama film The Long Way Home alongside Yeo Jin-goo. Seol played the role of Jang Nam-bok, a farmer who is suddenly dragged to the battlefield with a newborn baby in the war film Western Front, the directorial debut of playwright Cheon Seong-il. The film depicts the story of the confrontation between Jang Nam-bok of the South Korean Army and Kim Yeong-gwang (Yeo Jin-goo) of the North Korean Army ahead of the armistice agreement in July 1953. With this film, he took on the role of a soldier for the third time following the previous films Peppermint Candy and Silmido.

2016-present 
In 2017, Sol starred opposite Im Si-wan in The Merciless. It was shown out of competition in the Midnight Screenings section at the 70th Cannes Film Festival on May 24, 2017.  The film brought Sol to win Best Actor awards at the 54th Grand Bell Awards and 37th Korean Association of Film Critics Awards. He next starred in thriller film Memoir of a Murderer, as a retired serial killer with Alzheimer's disease. For his performance in Memoir of a Murderer, Sol received Best Actor awards at the 17th Director's Cut Awards in 2017 and the 9th Korea Film Reporters Association Film Awards (KOFRA) in 2018. The release of Sol's third film in 2017, I Want to Know Your Parents, has been postponed indefinitely following the scandal of actor Oh Dal-su.

Sol next starred in a 2019 film Idol opposite Han Suk-kyu and Chun Woo-hee, which opened in March. Despite the solid acting by three senior actors, Idol received mix reviews. In April 2019, Sol reunited with Jeon Do-yeon, eighteen years after I Wish I Had a Wife, in the film Birthday. The film, inspired by the Sinking of MV Sewol tragedy, deals with the struggles faced by a couple who lose their son in a tragic accident. The film had its international premiere at the 2019 Far East Film Festival in Udine. The same year, Sol starred in the human comedy film Man to Men with Cho Jin-woong.

Sol has reunited with The Merciless director Byun Sung-hyun for the film Kingmaker. It was released in December 2021.

In 2022 Sol will be honoured by 26th Bucheon International Fantastic Film Festival by hosting an actor special exhibition 'The Actor, Sol Kyung-gu' focusing on actor Sol Kyung-gu's 29-year acting career along with various events such as the publication of a commemorative booklet entitled 'Sol Kyung-gu is Snow Gyeong-gu', and mega talk during the festival.

Personal life
Sol married the younger sister of actor Ahn Nae-sang in 1996. They have one daughter together. After being separated for four years, Sol and his wife divorced on July 21, 2006. 

On May 28, 2009, Sol married actress Song Yoon-ah. They have one son together. Sol and Song previously worked together in the films Jail Breakers (2002) and Lost in Love (2006).

Philanthropy 
Seol and his wife Song Yoon-ah supported the entire cost of surgery for Ha-jin, who was suffering from congenital heart disease. In July 2010, they visited Seoul St. Mary's Hospital.

In April 2014, Seol Kyung-gu, along with Song Yoon-ah, said through the Korean Committee for UNICEF, "I felt pain that is difficult to express in words while watching the Sewol ferry disaster. I sincerely hope for recovery," and donated 100 million won to the victims of the Sewol disaster.

On February 13, 2023, Sol donated 50 million won to help 2023 Turkey–Syria earthquake, by donating money through Korea's UNICEF Committee with participation in the Emergency Relief for Children Victims of the Earthquake in Turkey and Syria' programme along with Song Yoon-ah.

Filmography

Film

Television series

Music video appearances

Stage credit

Musical

Theater

Awards and nominations

Listicles

References

External links

1968 births
Living people
South Korean male film actors
South Korean male stage actors
South Korean male television actors
20th-century South Korean male actors
21st-century South Korean male actors
Hanyang University alumni
People from South Chungcheong Province
South Korean Roman Catholics
Best New Actor Paeksang Arts Award (film) winners
Grand Prize Paeksang Arts Award (Film) winners